Veedevadandi Babu is a 1997 Indian Telugu-language Comedy film written and directed by E. V. V. Satyanarayana and Cinematography by Chota K. Naidu. The film is an official remake of the Tamil film Ullathai Allitha which itself was heavily inspired by the Hindi film Andaz Apna Apna. The film stars Mohan Babu, Shilpa Shetty and Tanikella Bharani. The film was dubbed in Bengali as Amar Pratiggya.

Cast
 Mohan Babu as Sriram
 Shilpa Shetty as Shilpa
 Tanikella Bharani as Ongole
 Brahmanandam
 Chalapathi Rao
 Kolla Ashok Kumar
 Kota Srinivasa Rao
 Srihari
 A. V. S. Subramanyam
 Ruchi
 Ironleg Sastri

Soundtrack 

Music was composed by Sirpy. Music released by T-Series.

References

External links
 

1990s Telugu-language films
Films directed by E. V. V. Satyanarayana
Telugu remakes of Tamil films
Telugu remakes of Hindi films